Seadornavirus is a genus of viruses, in the family Reoviridae, in the subfamily Sedoreovirinae. Human, cattle, pig, and mosquitoes serve as natural hosts. There are three species in this genus: Banna virus (BAV), Kadipiro virus and Liao ning virus. Each of these viruses has been isolated from Aedes, Anopheles and Culex mosquito populations, but only BAV has been shown to cause infection in humans, in which the symptoms are similar to Japanese encephalitis—fever, malaise and encephalitis. The word seadornavirus is an portmanteau, meaning Southeast Asian dodeca RNA virus.

Taxonomy
The following three species are assigned to the genus:
Banna virus
Kadipiro virus
Liao ning virus

Structure
Viruses in Seadornavirus are non-enveloped, with icosahedral geometries, and T=13, T=2 symmetry. The diameter is around 60-70 nm. Genomes are linear and segmented. Segments range in length from 862 to 3747 base pairs, totaling 21 kb in length. The genome codes for 12 proteins.

Life cycle
Viral replication is cytoplasmic. Entry into the host cell is achieved by attachment to host receptors, which mediates endocytosis. Replication follows the double-stranded RNA virus replication model. Double-stranded RNA virus transcription is the method of transcription. The virus exits the host cell by monopartite non-tubule guided viral movement. Human, cattle, pig, mosquitoes (arthropod-borne), and mosquitoes serve as the natural host. Transmission routes are zoonosis and bite.

References

External links
 Viralzone: Seadornavirus
 ICTV
 ICTV home page

Virus genera
Seadornaviruses